Mary Jane is an old-fashioned peanut butter- and molasses-flavored taffy-type candy. Originally made in 1914 by Robert O. Lord's candy manufacturing company, he named it after his favorite aunt. Lord sold his company to the Charles N. Miller Company in the Depression. It was then made by Stark Candy Company. It was later manufactured by Necco starting in 2008 following their acquisition of Stark Candy. Charles Miller initially made candy in his kitchen in what was once the home of Paul Revere. It has featured the same "little girl" illustration on its wrappers since its inception. 

Mary Jane candies were produced by Necco at The New England Confectionery Co. in Revere, Massachusetts, until their 2018 bankruptcy, when Mary Janes and the company's other candy brands were auctioned off. No potential buyer was immediately found for Mary Janes. As Necco's purchaser, Spangler Candy Company thus retained the brand, but with no plans to make the candy. In October 2019, it was announced that the Atkinson Candy Company would make and sell Mary Janes starting in 2020 under a licensing agreement with Spangler.

References

External links
Mary Jane brand page at Atkinson Candy Company

Brand name confectionery
Necco brands
Products introduced in 1914
Peanut butter confectionery
Companies that filed for Chapter 11 bankruptcy in 2018